Olga Carmona García (born 12 June 2000) is a Spanish professional footballer who plays as a left back for Liga F club Real Madrid CF and the Spain women's national team.

Club career
Born in Seville, Andalusia, Carmona played youth football for Sevilla. In Carmona's first professional season, she contributed with five goals in 25 matches as Sevilla finished 12th.

International goals

Personal life
Carmona's older brother, Fran Carmona, is also a footballer and plays as a defender for Sevilla C.

Honors
UEFA Women's Under-19 Championship (1): 2018

References

External links
 

2000 births
Living people
People from Seville
Footballers from Andalusia
Spanish women's footballers
Women's association football wingers
Sevilla FC (women) players
Real Madrid Femenino players
Primera División (women) players
Spain women's youth international footballers
Spain women's international footballers
UEFA Women's Euro 2022 players
21st-century Spanish women